El Salvador competed at the 2011 Pan American Games in Guadalajara, Mexico from October 14 to 30, 2011. El Salvador's team consisted of 79 athletes in 22 sports.

Medalists

Archery

El Salvador qualified three male athletes in the archery competition.

Men

Athletics

El Salvador qualified two male athletes.

Men

Track and road events

Field events

Women

Track and road events

Beach volleyball

El Salvador qualified a men's team in the beach volleyball competition.

Bowling

El Salvador qualified two male and two female athletes in the bowling competition.

Men

Individual

Pairs

Women

Individual

Pairs

Boxing

El Salvador qualified two athlete in the 52 kg and 75 kg men's category.

Men

Cycling

Road

Men

Women

Mountain biking

Men

Women

Equestrian

Eventing

Individual jumping

Fencing

El Salvador qualified two athletes in the men's épée competition, one athlete in the men's sabre competition, and one athlete in the women's foil competition.

Men

Women

Gymnastics

Artistic
El Salvador qualified one male athlete in the artistic gymnastics competition.

Men

Individual qualification & Team Finals

Judo

El Salvador qualified two athletes in the 66 kg and 100 kg men's categories and one athlete in the 70 kg women's category.

Men

Repechage Rounds

Karate

El Salvador qualified four male athletes.

Roller skating

El Salvador qualified a men's and women's team in the roller skating competition.

Men

Women

Rowing

Men

Women

Shooting

El Salvador qualified six athletes in shooting.

Men

Women

Swimming

El Salvador qualified four swimmers.

Men

Women

Squash

El Salvador qualified three male athletes in the squash competition.

Men

Team

Table tennis

El Salvador qualified three male and three female athletes in the table tennis competition.

Men

Women

Tennis

Men

Taekwondo

El Salvador qualified one athlete in the 67 kg women's category.

Women

Triathlon

Men

Weightlifting

Wrestling

El Salvador qualified one athlete in the 48 kg women's freestyle category.

Men
Freestyle

Women
Freestyle

References

Nations at the 2011 Pan American Games
P
2011